The 1992–93 Botola is the 37th season of the Moroccan Premier League of Association Football. Wydad Casablanca are the holders of the title.

References

Morocco 1992–93

Botola seasons
Morocco
Botola